Bernard Masson (20 September 1948 – 22 December 1977) was a French racing cyclist. He rode in the 1974 Tour de France.

References

1948 births
1977 deaths
French male cyclists
Place of birth missing